Spirit of 77 is a sports bar and restaurant in Portland, Oregon.

History 
Opened by Nate Tilden in 2010, the bar is named after the Portland Trail Blazers championship season (1977 NBA Finals). The business closed temporarily for kitchen renovations in 2012.

Reception 
The bar was included in Esquire "best bars" list in 2011. In 2019, Eater Portland recommended the bar for sports viewing near the Moda Center and Oregon Convention Center.

References

External links

 

2010 establishments in Oregon
Drinking establishments in Oregon
Lloyd District, Portland, Oregon
Northeast Portland, Oregon
Restaurants established in 2010
Restaurants in Portland, Oregon